Push Push are a rock band formed in the 1990s from Auckland, New Zealand. They are best known for their single "Trippin'".

History

Formation and Early Years (1985-86)

Former Rangitoto College students Mikey Havoc (vocals), Ken "Kenny" Green (drummer), Andy Kane (aka Andy Wilson, lead guitar), and Steve Abplanalp (bass) formed the band in Auckland around 1985 or 1986. Silver (guitar) then joined, followed by Scott Cortese (drummer, formerly in the band Whiskey and Lace) who replaced Green.

A Trillion Shades of Happy (1992)

The band released their debut (and only) album A Trillion Shades of Happy in 1992. Their first single "Trippin'" was recorded at Airforce Studios (Auckland), with the drum track done in one take. The song reached #1 on the New Zealand charts. The bonus track "I Love My Leather Jacket" was recorded at The Lab. Backing vocals on the track 'Dig My World' were provided by Jan Hellriegel. "Song 27" and "What My Baby Likes" were also released from the album, and went on to be further New Zealand Top 10 hits for the band.

Opening for AC/DC (1992)

The band opened for AC/DC at Mount Smart Stadium in 1992. Apparently the band drew straws to see who was going to walk onstage first as there were around 50,000 people in the crowd and they were nervous; Scott Cortese the drummer drew the short straw. Their set ended prematurely however as a fire started under the stage and Mikey Havoc announced this to the crowd which made the promoters unhappy. They also apparently blew up the speaker system; as a result AC/DC were unable to play as loudly as they usually did.

Awards

In 1991 Push Push was awarded the top band award and best video award for "Trippin" at the RIANZ awards.

Announcement (2016)

In February 2016, Steve Abplanalp made a guest appearance on the New Zealand Comedy Gameshow 7 Days (New Zealand TV series), where he made the announcement the band was back together and were set to release a new single as well as play a few shows; however as of 2021 no new single has eventuated.

Discography

Albums

Singles

Awards

References

External links 
AudioCulture profile
http://historyofnewzealandheavymetal.weebly.com/push-push.html

New Zealand rock music groups